Kappa Canis Majoris, Latinized from κ Canis Majoris, is a solitary, blue-white hued star in the constellation Canis Major. It is visible to the naked eye with an apparent visual magnitude of +3.87. Based upon an annual parallax shift of 7.70 mas as seen from Earth, this star is located about 660 light years from the Sun.

This is a B-type main-sequence star with a stellar classification of B1.5 Ve, although Hiltner et al. (1969) classified it as B1.5 IVe suggesting it is a subgiant star. The 'e' suffix indicates it is a rapidly rotating Be star with a circumstellar decretion disk of heated gas. It is classified as a Gamma Cassiopeiae type variable star and its brightness varies from magnitude +3.4 to +3.97. The star became 50% brighter between 1963 and 1978, increasing from magnitude 3.96 or so to 3.52.

Naming

References

B-type main-sequence stars
Gamma Cassiopeiae variable stars
Canis Majoris, Kappa
Canis Major
Durchmusterung objects
Canis Majoris, 13
050013
032759
2538